The Raid on Dover (known as the Cochecho Massacre) happened in Dover, New Hampshire on June 27–28, 1689. Led by Chief Kancamagus, it began King William's War, a series of Indian massacres orchestrated by Jean-Vincent d'Abbadie de Saint-Castin and Father Louis-Pierre Thury.

Cause 
At the end of King Philip's War (1675-1678), a number of Indians fleeing the Massachusetts Bay Colony militia took refuge with the Abenaki tribe living in Dover. The militia ordered Major Richard Waldron to attack the natives and turn refugee combatants over to them. Waldron believed he could capture them without a pitched battle, and so on September 7, 1676, invited the natives—about 400 in total, half local and half refugees—to participate in a mock battle against the militia near Cochecho Falls. After the natives discharged their guns, Waldron and Major Charles Frost took them prisoner. He sent both refugee combatants and those locals who violently objected to Boston, where seven or eight were convicted of insurrection and executed. The rest were sold into slavery, most in Barbados. Local Indians were released, but never forgave Waldron for the deception, which violated both sides' rules of honor and hospitality. Waldron was appointed Chief Justice for New Hampshire in 1683.

Revenge 

Thirteen years passed and settlers believed the incident forgotten, when members of the newly formed Wabanaki Confederacy arrived at Dover. Citizens expressed concern to Waldron, but he told them to "go and plant your pumpkins, and he would take care of the Indians." On June 27, 1689, two native women appeared at each of five garrison houses, asking permission to sleep by the fire, not uncommon in peaceful times. All but one house accepted. In the dark early hours of the next day, the women unfastened the doors, allowing braves who had concealed themselves to enter. The sword-wielding elderly Waldron was cut across his belly with knives, with each warrior saying "I cross out my account." Five or six dwelling houses were burned, along with the mills. Fifty-two colonists, a full quarter of the entire population, were captured or slain.

Aftermath 
Captives included Waldron's seven-year-old grandchild Sarah Gerrish, daughter of Elizabeth and John Gerrish. These were the first recorded British captives that natives abducted and sold in Quebec.

In the following month Pemaquid, Maine, met a similar fate. John Gyles was taken prisoner at Pemaquid and brought back to Dover, where he reported being in the company of captives taken in the earlier Dover raid.

Legacy 
The William Damm Garrison House, built in 1675, survived the raid, and was moved to the grounds of the Woodman Institute Museum. It is listed on the National Register of Historic Places.

References 

Texts
Belknap. The History of New Hampshire. Vol. 1. 1792, p. 128
 The history of the great Indian war of 1675 and 1676, commonly called Philip ... By Benjamin Church, Thomas Church, Samuel Gardner Drake. p. 187 Church's book
Captivity Narrative from the Raid on Dover, Samuel Drake, p. 68
Cotton Mather. Magnalia Christi Americana, or, The ecclesiastical history of New-England: from its first planting in the year 1620, unto the year of Our Lord, 1698, in seven books (1820)

Military history of Acadia
Military history of Nova Scotia
Military history of New England
Military history of Canada
King William's War
History of New Hampshire
Conflicts in 1689
Massacres in the Thirteen Colonies
Massacres by Native Americans
Captives of Native Americans
Military raids
1689 in North America
1689 in New Hampshire
1689 in the Thirteen Colonies
Dover, New Hampshire
17th century in New Hampshire